Stefan Nastić (born November 22, 1992) is a Serbian-Canadian former professional basketball player. He played collegiate basketball for Stanford University.

College career
Nastić joined Stanford Basketball in 2010. He appeared in five games off the bench before missing the remainder of the year with a foot injury. As a fifth year senior, Nastić started all 37 games, averaging 13.4 points and 6.5 rebounds. He was All-Pac-12 Honorable Mention pick, Kareem Abdul-Jabbar Center of the Year Award candidate, and was named to Postseason NIT All-Tournament Team, averaging 10.6 points and 7.0 rebounds over five games.

Professional career
After going undrafted in the 2015 NBA draft, Nastić played with the Golden State Warriors and the San Antonio Spurs in the 2015 NBA Summer League. On July 29, 2015, Bosnian club Igokea announced that they have signed Nastić, after which the player denied that he has signed a contract with them.
On August 12, 2015, he signed a three-year contract with Crvena zvezda. On May 23, 2016, he parted ways with Zvezda.

Career statistics

Euroleague

|-
| style="text-align:left;"| 2015–16
| style="text-align:left;"| Crvena zvezda
| 2 || 1 || 4.15 || .286 || .000 || .000 || 1.5 || .0 || .0 || .0 || 2.0 ||0 
|-class="sortbottom"
| style="text-align:center;" colspan="2"| Career
| 2 || 1 || 4.15 || .286 || .000 || .000 || 1.5 || .0 || .0 || .0 || 2.0 ||0

National team career
Nastić was a member of the Serbian national basketball team that won a silver medal at the 2013 Mediterranean Games in Turkey.

See also 
 List of Serbian NBA Summer League players

References

External links
 Stefan Nastic at usbasket.com
 Stefan Nastić at aba-liga.com
 Stefan Nastić at draftexpress.com
 Stefan Nastić at espn.com
 Stefan Nastić at euroleague.net
 Stefan Nastić at gostanford.com

1992 births
Living people
ABA League players
Centers (basketball)
KK Crvena zvezda players
Serbian men's basketball players
Serbian expatriate basketball people in Canada
Serbian expatriate basketball people in the United States
Basketball players from Novi Sad
Stanford Cardinal men's basketball players
Mediterranean Games silver medalists for Serbia
Competitors at the 2013 Mediterranean Games
Canadian people of Serbian descent
Canadian expatriate basketball people in Serbia
Mediterranean Games medalists in basketball